Karnam Malleswari won a bronze medal in the 2000 Summer Olympics at Sydney, which made her the first Indian woman to win an Olympic medal. In 1992, she participated in the Asian championship which took place in Thailand and stood second and won three silver medals. She also won three Bronze medals in the world championship.

In the 2014 Commonwealth Games in Glasgow, Khumukcham Sanjita Chanu won the gold medal in the women's 48 kg category, while Mirabai Chanu took the silver in the same event. In the men's 56 kg category, Sukhen Dey won gold and Ganesh Mali won bronze and Sathish Sivalingam won the gold medal in the 77 kg category, with 149 kg snatch, and 179 kg clean and jerk lifts, totalling 328 kg. His lift of 149 kg in the snatch, set a new games record. Affin Varghese won the gold medal in the 57 kg category, with 114 kg snatch, and 130 kg clean and jerk lifts, totalling 298 kg. His lift of 139 kg in the snatch, set a new state record in the junior category.

The headquarters of the Indian Weightlifting Federation is in New Delhi. The Federation is affiliated to the Indian Olympic Association (Delhi) and is also a member of Asian Weightlifting Federation (Tehran) and International Weightlifting Federation (Budapest). The present President of Indian Weightlifting Federation is Mr. Sahdev Yadav.

The International Weightlifting Federation banned the Indian Weightlifting Federation from participating in all international competitions for one year, as three Indian women weightlifters—S Sunaina, Sanamacha Chanu and Pratima Kumari, were accused of doping offences in various international competitions in a single year.

Total medals won by Indian Weightlifters in Major tournaments

Notable Performance at Summer Olympics

References

External links
DigVijay Gymnasia